Guzal Darreh Rural District is in Bagh Helli District of Soltaniyeh County, Zanjan province, Iran. At the National Census of 2006, its population was 4,959 in 1,324 households, when it was in Soltaniyeh District of Abhar County. There were 4,864 inhabitants in 1,451 households at the following census of 2011. After the census, Soltaniyeh District was separated to establish Soltaniyeh County. At the most recent census of 2016, the population of the rural district was 4,794 in 1,552 households, by which time it was in Bagh Helli District of the newly formed county. The largest of its 10 villages was Guzal Darreh-ye Sofla, with 1,532 people.

References 

Soltaniyeh County

Rural Districts of Zanjan Province

Populated places in Zanjan Province

Populated places in Soltaniyeh County